Elizabeth Littleford (born July 17, 1968) is an American actress, comedian and television personality. She is best known as one of the original correspondents on The Daily Show on Comedy Central from 1996 to 2000. Littleford has also appeared in the shows I'm in the Band and Dog with a Blog.

Early life
Littleford was born in Nashville, Tennessee, the daughter of Jackie, a professor, and Philip O. Littleford, a cardiologist and inventor. She grew up in Winter Park, Florida. Her father and brother died when she was sixteen in a pontoon plane accident during an Alaskan fishing trip. A National Merit Scholarship Program finalist in high school, she attended Swarthmore College in Pennsylvania for three years before taking up acting classes at New York University; she eventually graduated from The New School for Social Research.

Career

Early in her acting career, Littleford worked in improvisational theatre with the Chicago City Limits group, founded a sketch comedy troupe, and wrote her own one-woman show, This Is Where I Get Off, which she performed with the Circle Repertory Company. Littleford is perhaps most famous for her pioneering role as the first female correspondent on The Daily Show. She has also guest-starred on numerous television programs beginning in the late 1990s such as Spin City, The West Wing, Family Guy, and Frasier. Littleford was also a celebrity commentator on VH1's I Love the 80s Strikes Back in 2003, I Love the 90s in 2004, I Love the 90s: Part Deux in 2005, I Love the New Millennium and The Great Debate in 2009.

She was the female lead on the short-lived Fox series Method and Red, and also starred as Ben Tennyson's mother Sandra in Ben 10: Race Against Time, and reprised the role in the Ben 10: Alien Force episode 20 and again in Ben 10: Ultimate Alien.  She has appeared in TV commercials for Laughing Cow cheese, Cascade, and a hotel chain.

Littleford starred in the Disney XD original show I'm in the Band, the 2010 Disney channel movie Starstruck, and played Suzanne Berger on MTV's The Hard Times of RJ Berger, Dana on ABC's Desperate Housewives, and the realtor on The Fosters. More recently, she had a starring role as Ellen Jennings in the Disney Channel original series Dog with a Blog and a guest appearance on Dead to Me on Netflix.

In 2015, Littleford received a Peabody Award for her groundbreaking work on The Daily Show with Jon Stewart from 1996 to 2000 as the show's "Original Female Correspondent."

In 2021, Littleford was in the film Senior Moment starring William Shatner, Jean Smart and Christopher Lloyd.

Personal life
Littleford lives in Los Angeles. She was married to Rob Fox, a director and producer who worked alongside her on The Daily Show, from 1998 to 2015; they had a son (born 2005) and an adopted daughter (born 2012). Fox died in 2017.

Filmography

Film

Television

References

External links

American women comedians
Living people
Actresses from Nashville, Tennessee
Actresses from Florida
Swarthmore College alumni
New York University alumni
The New School alumni
American television actresses
American film actresses
American voice actresses
20th-century American actresses
21st-century American actresses
Comedians from Tennessee
Comedians from Florida
20th-century American comedians
21st-century American comedians
Year of birth missing (living people)